Lubomír Štach (born May 28, 1986) is a Czech professional ice hockey defenceman currently playing for HC TWK Innsbruck of the Austrian Hockey League (EBEL). He previously played with HC Oceláři Třinec in the Czech Extraliga during the 2010–11 Czech Extraliga season.

References

External links

1986 births
Czech ice hockey defencemen
HC TWK Innsbruck players
HC Kometa Brno players
Living people
HC Oceláři Třinec players
Orli Znojmo players
HC Olomouc players
VHK Vsetín players
People from Vsetín
Sportspeople from the Zlín Region
Peterborough Petes (ice hockey) players
Guelph Storm players
Belleville Bulls players
ESV Kaufbeuren players
HK Dukla Trenčín players
Czech expatriate ice hockey players in Canada
Czech expatriate ice hockey players in Germany
Czech expatriate ice hockey players in Slovakia
Expatriate ice hockey players in Austria
Czech expatriate sportspeople in Austria